Stephen John "Steve" Austin (born 14 February 1951) is an Australian athlete. He competed in the 5000m and 10000m at the 1980 Summer Olympics.

References

1951 births
Living people
Australian male long-distance runners
Athletes (track and field) at the 1980 Summer Olympics
Olympic athletes of Australia
20th-century Australian people